Glyphodes sibillalis, the mulberry leaftier moth, is a moth of the family Crambidae. It is found in the southern United States (including Georgia), Central and South America and the West Indies.

The larvae feed on Morus (mulberry) species.

Gallery

References

Moths described in 1859
Glyphodes